Piker's Peak is a 1957 Warner Bros. Looney Tunes animated short directed by Friz Freleng. The short was released on May 25, 1957, and stars Bugs Bunny. The title is a pun on Pike's Peak, although that respected mountain summit is in North America rather than in Europe.

The film is a mountain film. It features a mountaineering competition about the first person able to climb an unconquered mountain peak in the Swiss Alps. The mountain featured is fictional, but its name is based on the Matterhorn.

Plot
In the Swiss Alps, when the mayor announces a competition with a prize of "50,000 kronkites"  to the one who can climb the Schmatterhorn first, Yosemite Sam quickly volunteers.

When he starts climbing, Bugs Bunny emerges from a rabbit hole on the mountain, hearing a band playing the send-off tune and a crowd cheering. He inquires about the sounds, to which Sam brags about his dare and the prize. Bugs decides he wants in, and climbs up the mountain an easier way than Sam. Realising that Bugs now plans on winning, Sam tries to pull him back down ("Get down, ya long-eared mountain goat!") In the process, he causes Bugs to pull down a boulder, which chases Sam back down the mountain and flattens him.

Sam climbs back up and pretends to form a partnership with Bugs. He climbs up with a rope tied to him, and another rope tied to Bugs, which he throws up to Sam. Bugs then shouts his "What's up, doc?" catchphrase, to which Sam replies "Not what's up, what's down!" revealing that he has double-crossed Bugs, tied his rope to another boulder and is about to push it over. However, it turns out that the rope around the rock is also tied to Sam! Despite his attempts to free himself with a Swiss army knife, he is pulled to the bottom of the mountain with the rock. As he prepares to try again, the band and crowd also sound again.

Sam runs back up and struggles to climb over a ledge. Bugs "helps" him over it, but Sam ends up sliding back down the mountain (Music and crowd again).

Sam runs back up to a cliff, which Bugs is climbing up. Sam tries to push another boulder over the cliff, but as soon as he lets go, it rolls after him, chasing him off another cliff. When he lands, the impact causes the boulder to fall after him, crushing him through the ledge onto the ground below.

Sam catches Bugs under a pile of snow. Bugs attempts to warn him to be careful to prevent an avalanche. Sam attempts to use this to his advantage by shouting and shooting his pistol, hoping the avalanche will get rid of Bugs. Instead, all the snow falls on Sam. A St. Bernard pulls a frozen Sam out of the snow, makes and drinks a cocktail, then runs off hiccuping.

Sam chases Bugs all the way to the top of the mountain. Once Bugs states that they have reached the top, Sam pushes him off, then starts celebrating. However, it turns out that he is on top of the Eiffel Tower, and Bugs says "Well, as long as he's happy, why tell him?" The band (who is at the base of the tower) plays the same song one last time, continuously into the "That's all Folks!" end titles.

Soundtrack
"Bad Swiss Band" (sendoff music). Written by Carl Stalling
"When I'd Yoo-Hoo in the Valley (to My Lulu in the Hills)", uncredited. Written by Henry Russell and Murray Martin
"Little Brown Jug", uncredited.  Written by Joseph Winner
"The Bartered Bride, Opening Chorus", uncredited.  Written by Bedřich Smetana

See also
 List of American films of 1957
 List of Bugs Bunny cartoons
 List of Yosemite Sam cartoons

Notes

References

1957 films
1957 animated films
1957 short films
1950s Warner Bros. animated short films
Looney Tunes shorts
Short films directed by Friz Freleng
Films scored by Carl Stalling
Bugs Bunny films
Films set in the Alps
Films set in Switzerland
Yosemite Sam films
Films produced by Edward Selzer
Mountaineering films
1950s English-language films